Premiers Conference (also spelt Premiers' Conference or Premier's Conference) may refer to:

 Council of Australian Governments (Australia)
 First Ministers' conference (Canada)